The 2016–17 season is the 34th season in Segunda División played by Real Oviedo, a Spanish football club based in Oviedo, Asturias. It covers a period from 1 July 2016 to 30 June 2017.

Season overview

Pre-season

Players

Squad information

Transfers

In

Out

Technical staff

Pre-season and friendlies

Competitions

Segunda División

Results summary

Result round by round

Matches

Copa del Rey

Second round

Statistics

Squad statistics

 

|-
|colspan="12"|Players who have left the club after the start of the season:

Disciplinary record

|-
|colspan=14 align=left|Players who have left the club after the start of the season:

See also
2016–17 Segunda División
2016–17 Copa del Rey

References

External links

Real Oviedo
Real Oviedo seasons